Gonospira turgidula is a species of air-breathing land snail, terrestrial pulmonate gastropod mollusk in the family Streptaxidae, endemic to Réunion.

Description
The length of the shell attains 7.3 mm.

Distribution
This marine species occurs in the Indian Ocean off Réunion

References

 Deshayes, G. P., 1863 Catalogue des mollusques de l'ile de la Réunion (Bourbon). Annexe E, in: Maillard, L. Notes sur l'isle de La Réunion, p. 1-4, 1-144

Gonospira
Taxonomy articles created by Polbot